Stanwich Congregational Church is a nondenominational Christian church in Greenwich, Connecticut.  It was founded in 1731.  The congregation launched a second campus in Stamford, Connecticut, in 2014.

References

External links 
 Stanwich Church

Churches in Greenwich, Connecticut